Maribor Cathedral, dedicated to Saint John the Baptist, is a Roman Catholic cathedral in the city of Maribor, northeastern Slovenia. The church is the seat of the Roman Catholic Archdiocese of Maribor and the parish church of the Parish of Maribor–St. John the Baptist. It is also the resting place of the Bishop Anton Martin Slomšek, an advocate of Slovene culture.

Architecture
The originally Romanesque building dates to the late 12th century. In the Gothic period, it got a rib vault, a larger choir and two side naves, whereas in the Baroque period, it got the chapel of Saint Francis Xavier and the chapel of the Holy Cross.

References

External links

Cathedral
Roman Catholic cathedrals in Slovenia